Seinabo Sey (born 7 October 1990) is a Swedish singer and songwriter best known for her international hit song "Younger".

Early life 
Seinabo Sey was born in Södermalm, Stockholm, on 7 October 1990. She is of both Swedish and Gambian ancestry. She moved to Halmstad, Sweden, at the age of eight, and attended Östergårdsskolans music program for musically gifted teenagers.

Sey was inspired musically by artists such as Alicia Keys and Beyoncé early in life. She grew up in Halmstad, Sweden, surrounded by artistry and creativity. Her father Maudo Sey was a renowned musician in The Gambia and Senegal, West Africa. Her mother, Madeleine Sundqvist,  is Swedish. Seinabo Sey has two siblings; a younger brother Maudo Sey jr and sister Seidato Sey, she is also half-sister to the artist Fatima Bramme Sey and the radio host Amie Bramme Sey. In an interview, Sey recalled being nine years old and watching MTV, which led her to become obsessed with music and singing. Sey wanted to study at Yale as an adolescent, being inspired by the character Rory Gilmore on the television show Gilmore Girls. She took academic steps towards that dream, enrolling in an International Baccalaureate program in Halmstad, Sweden, although at the age of 16 she ended up changing course, moving to Stockholm to attend and later graduate from Fryshusets esthetics program with a concentration in soul music.

In an interview Sey noted: "I was really academically tracked... I loved to sing but I could never fathom singing by myself. I tried to push away the whole music dream and thought I had to do something more in line with that, like becoming a lawyer or something, until I was around sixteen. But then I realised I couldn't really live in that small town so I moved to Stockholm and started music school".

Career 
After Sey started working with producer Magnus Lidehäll she released her debut single "Younger", followed by "Hard Time" and "Pistols at Dawn". The singles, which were described as soul pop, received much attention and accolades in Sweden and abroad. Kygo, a Norwegian musician, remixed "Younger", releasing it in Norway and the United States. This version, known as "Younger (Kygo Remix)", peaked on the Norwegian VG-lista chart (for seven consecutive weeks) and on the US Billboard Hot Dance Club Songs. On 16 April 2015, "Younger" was featured on BBC Radio 1 as their Track of the Day.

In 2014, EDM duo Galantis used a sample of Sey's single "Hard Times" in a song that appears on their self-titled EP titled "Friends (Hard Times)".

Sey performed at the 2014 Swedish Grammy Awards and at Allsång på Skansen in Stockholm. In October 2014, Seinabo Sey released the critically acclaimed EP  For Madeleine, dedicated to and named after her mother. The EP was produced by Magnus Lidehäll and written by, among others, Salem Al Fakir, Oscar Linnros and Vincent Pontare, along with Seinabo Sey herself. That same month, she performed at the Royal Dramatic Theatre in Stockholm. She also performed at the 2014 Nobel Peace Prize concert.

On 30 March 2015 Sey released her second EP, the four-track For Maudo, dedicated to and named after her father, . Repeating the success of For Madeleine, the EP received favorable reviews and widespread critical acclaim in Sweden and abroad. For Maudo was produced by Magnus Lidehäll, and one Swedish review described the EP as a "weightless and spellbinding" crossover between soul and modern pop. Another review described the EP as being composed of "exceptionally beautiful music".

On 23 October 2015 Sey released her first album, called Pretend. The album contains 16 tracks, including "Younger" and "Hard Time". In November 2016, the album's titular track "Pretend" was the featured music in the season 6 Girls trailer.

Also in 2015, parts of her 2014 song, "Hard Time", was utilized as theme song for Swedish murder-mystery TV series, 100 Code (Hundred Code). The show screened in Germany and then spread to other countries; it is now on rerun on cable in the United States and elsewhere.

On 7 September 2018 she released her second album I'm a Dream.

Awards and accolades
 2014 - Breakthrough of the year - 2014 Swedish Music Publishers Prize
 2015 - Best Newcomer - 2014 Swedish Grammy Awards
 2015 - Soul/R&B artist of the year - 2014 Kingsize Awards

Discography

Albums

Extended plays

Singles

Other charted songs

Notes

References

External links

Living people
1990 births
Swedish women singer-songwriters
English-language singers from Sweden
Swedish singer-songwriters
Swedish pop singers
Musicians from Stockholm
Singers from Stockholm
Swedish people of Gambian descent
21st-century Swedish singers
21st-century Swedish women singers
Musikförläggarnas pris winners